This is a list of seasons completed by the Arkansas Razorbacks men's college basketball team.

Seasons

  Earned tournament berth, but did not participate due to car accident

References

 
Arkansas Razorbacks
Arkansas Razorbacks basketball seasons